Lick Creek is an unincorporated community in Summers County, West Virginia, United States.

The community takes its name from nearby Lick Creek.

References

Unincorporated communities in Summers County, West Virginia
Unincorporated communities in West Virginia